Anton Gennadyevich Khazov (born 28 April 1979) is a Russian football coach and a former player.

Club career
He made his Russian Premier League debut for FC Dynamo Moscow on 5 May 2001 in a game against FC Chernomorets Novorossiysk.

Honours
 Russian Second Division Zone Povolzhye top scorer: 2000 (26 goals).

External links
 
  Player page on the official FC Shinnik Yaroslavl website

References

1979 births
Living people
Sportspeople from Kaliningrad
Russian footballers
Russia under-21 international footballers
FC Dynamo Moscow players
FC Shinnik Yaroslavl players
Russian Premier League players
FC Volga Nizhny Novgorod players
FC Tom Tomsk players
FC Torpedo NN Nizhny Novgorod players
FC Orenburg players
Association football forwards
FC Nizhny Novgorod (2015) players
Russian football managers
Russian Premier League managers